Horovod is a free and open-source software framework for distributed deep learning training using TensorFlow, Keras, PyTorch, and Apache MXNet. Horovod is hosted under the Linux Foundation AI (LF AI). Horovod has the goal of improving the speed, scale, and resource allocation when training a machine learning model.

See also
 Comparison of deep learning software
 Differentiable programming
 All-Reduce

References

External links 
 
 

2017 software
Deep learning software
Free software programmed in C++
Free software programmed in Python
Free statistical software
Open-source artificial intelligence
Python (programming language) scientific libraries
Software using the Apache license